Hatziioannou or Haji-Ioannou is a Greek surname. Notable people with the surname include:

 Clelia Haji-Ioannou (born 1970/71), Cypriot billionaire
 Leon Hatziioannou (born 1965), Canadian football player
 Loucas Haji-Ioannou (1927–2008), Greek-Cypriot shipping entrepreneur
 Polys Haji-Ioannou (born 1959/60), Cypriot billionaire
 Stelios Haji-Ioannou (born 1967), British Cypriot billionaire

Greek-language surnames
Surnames